The 1926 Kilkenny Senior Hurling Championship was the 32nd staging of the Kilkenny Senior Hurling Championship since its establishment by the Kilkenny County Board.

On 8 August 1926, Dicksboro won the championship after a 5-05 to 1-04 defeat of Mooncoin in the final. It was their second championship title overall and their first title in three championship seasons.

Results

Final

References

Kilkenny Senior Hurling Championship
Kilkenny Senior Hurling Championship